Brandon Taylor (born June 1, 1989) is an American writer. He holds graduate degrees from the University of Wisconsin-Madison and the University of Iowa and has received several fellowships for his writing. His short stories and essays have been published in many outlets and have received critical acclaim. His debut novel, Real Life, came out in 2020 and was shortlisted for the Booker Prize. In 2022, Taylor's Filthy Animals won The Story Prize awarded annually to collections of short fiction.

Early life and education
Taylor was born in Prattville, Alabama, and grew up in a small community outside Montgomery. Part of Taylor's upbringing was spent in a very religious, conservative Baptist setting.

Taylor attended Auburn University Montgomery for his undergraduate studies, and then joined a graduate biochemistry program, and after leaving in 2016 began a career in creative writing. He earned graduate degrees from the University of Wisconsin-Madison and the University of Iowa, where he was an Iowa Arts Fellow at the Iowa Writers' Workshop.

Career 
Taylor's short stories and essays have appeared in Guernica, American Short Fiction, Gulf Coast, Buzzfeed Reader, O: The Oprah Magazine, Gay Mag, The New Yorker, The Literary Review, and elsewhere. He is the senior editor of Electric Literatures "Recommended Reading". He is also a staff writer at Literary Hub.

In an interview for the Booker Prizes, Taylor said his influences were Mavis Gallant, André Aciman, Jane Austen, Alice Munro, Louise Glück, Elizabeth Bishop, Hilton Als, Pat Conroy and Ann Petry.

He received a fellowship from the Lambda Literary Foundation in 2017. He has also received fellowships for his writing from Kimbilio Fiction and the Tin House Summer Writer's Workshop.

His debut novel, Real Life, was published in 2020 with Riverhead Books. In 2021, a collection of his stories, Filthy Animals, was published by Penguin/Random House. Taylor's upcoming projects as of 2020 include a second novel titled Group Show.

Real Life
Taylor wrote his debut novel, Real Life, in less than five weeks, and he later explained his approach: "I was like, I’m going to sit down and knock this out so I can get on with my life.... Writing a novel ruins your life in really specific ways. Because you have to live inside of it. It’s just this sustained exercise in being miserable." It is "a campus novel imagined from the vantage of a character who is usually shunted to the sidelines ... a gay black student from a small town in Alabama".

Published in 2020 by Riverhead Books, Real Life received critical acclaim. Describing Taylor's work in the Los Angeles Times, Bethanne Patrick wrote: "His voice might best be described as a controlled roar of rage and pain, its energy held together by the careful thinking of a mind accustomed to good behavior." According to the review of Real Life by Jeremy O. Harris in The New York Times, "It is a curious novel to describe, for much of the plot involves excavating the profound from the mundane. As in the modernist novels of Woolf and Tolstoy cited in passing throughout, the true action of Taylor's novel exists beneath the surface, buried in subterranean spaces." Michael Arceneaux wrote in Time magazine: "Taylor's book isn't about overcoming trauma or the perils of academia or even just the experience of inhabiting a black body in a white space, even as Real Life does cover these subjects. Taylor is also tackling loneliness, desire and — more than anything — finding purpose, meaning and happiness in one's own life... How fortunate we are for Real Life, another stunning contribution from a community long deserving of the chance to tell its stories." Taylor himself has said: "I hope that it's a novel that challenges people to think about the ways that we fit together in our relationships with one another. I hope it makes people think really deeply about both the ways that they are harmed, and that they do harm to others."

Taylor's book tour to publicize his novel was cut short by the COVID-19 pandemic and associated restrictions on travel and public gatherings. Real Life was shortlisted for the 2020 Booker Prize. The New York Times included the novel on its list of "100 Notable Books of 2020".

In 2021, GQ reported that Real Life was being adapted into a movie with Kid Cudi.

Filthy Animals 
Taylor's collection of short stories, Filthy Animals, was awarded The Story Prize in 2022. In the Los Angeles Review of Books, Thomas Mar Wee wrote in praise of the book: "Neither cold nor detached, these stories are suffused with a warmth and humanity that recalled for me the uncanniness of Raymond Carver, the empathy of Alice Munro, and the meticulous irony of Chekhov."

Personal life
Taylor currently lives in New York City.  He identifies as queer.

Bibliography 
 Real Life (novel), Riverhead Books, 2020, . UK, Daunt Books, 
 Filthy Animals (short stories), Penguin/Random House, 2021
 The Late Americans (novel), forthcoming

Awards 
 2020: Booker Prize – Shortlisted (Real Life)
 2020: Center for Fiction First Novel Prize – Longlisted (Real Life)
 2021: Lambda Literary Award for Gay Fiction – Finalist (Real Life)
 2021: Young Lions Fiction Award – Finalist (Real Life)
 2021: The Story Prize – Winner (Filthy Animals)

References

External links
 Official website
 Audie Cornish, "Author Brandon Taylor On His Coming-Of-Age Novel 'Real Life'", All Things Considered, NPR, February 17, 2020.

1989 births
21st-century African-American people
21st-century African-American writers
21st-century American LGBT people
Auburn University at Montgomery alumni
Iowa Writers' Workshop alumni
LGBT African Americans
LGBT people from Alabama
American LGBT writers
Living people
Novelists from Alabama
Queer writers
University of Wisconsin–Madison alumni
Writers from Montgomery, Alabama